Colegio Antonio Rosmini is an Italian private & religious school in Maracaibo (Venezuela), created in the 1960s by the Rosminians.

History

The Colegio Italo venezolano "Antonio Rosmini" was created in 1960 in the urbanization "Los Cerros de Marin", Maracaibo, by the catholic missionary fathers Rosminiani Giambattista Zantedeschi, Josito Gattoni and James Connolly. They started it while associated with the Italian private school "Garibaldi", but in 1966 they created in a huge area of 70,000 square meters the actual big "campus" of the Colegio Rosmini.

Initially the school was opened with only a group of nearly one hundred Italian students, distributed between preschool and basic education from first through fifth grade (the courses were mainly in Italian language, but with some Spanish courses). In 1965 the Colegio Italo – Venezolano Antonio Rosmini of Maracaibo (estado Zulia) had 1300 students and it was the main school for the 87000 Italians residents in the Zulia area. Until the 1980s the "Rosmini" (as was called) was considered one of the Italian schools in Venezuela.

Actually the Unidad Educativa "Colegio Rosmini" has nearly 3000 students (including evening students) and the courses are only in Spanish language; however Italian is done as a foreign language, mandatory in High School ("Bachillerato venezolano").

In 1995 the Colegio Rosmini was enriched with a church dedicated to Saint Francis of Assisi, the saint patron of Italy. The Italian community in Maracaibo made possible the construction of the temple in honor of St. Francis of Assisi. On the altar, San Francisco is depicted in a painting by Italian artist Giovanni Vitti. Soon in Italy arose the view that the sanctuary of Maracaibo deserved a worthy bell tower of the great devotion to the venerable saint born in Gubbio: so, because of large donations from Italians, Maracaibo has a bell tower, that is a unique replica of the existing tower in St. Mark's Square in Venice. In addition to its majesty, it has eight bells made by hand in Anagni, capable of reproducing musical notes to offer a true concert of bells, in order to remember the message of Christ to neighbors and parishioners.

All the students of the Colegio Rosmini celebrate often in the area under the church and the belfry.

See also
 Colegio Agustín Codazzi
 Colegio Amerigo Vespucci
 Colegio De Marta
 Italo-Venezuelans
 Italian language in Venezuela
 Rosminians

Notes

Bibliography
 Cassani Pironti, Fabio. Gli italiani in Venezuela dall’Indipendenza al Secondo Dopoguerra. Roma, 2004
 Rosminians Official Site

External links
Official Website 

Italian international schools in South America
International schools in Venezuela